Sedberry-Holmes House is a historic home located at Fayetteville, Cumberland County, North Carolina. It was built in 1886, and is a two-story, five bay by three bay, Queen Anne style frame dwelling.  It has a two-story gabled projection with an attached corner turret.  It features a steep gable roof and wraparound porch.

It was listed on the National Register of Historic Places in 1973.

References

Houses on the National Register of Historic Places in North Carolina
Queen Anne architecture in North Carolina
Houses completed in 1886
Houses in Fayetteville, North Carolina
National Register of Historic Places in Cumberland County, North Carolina